Astemir Khazretaliyevich Soblirov (born 27 October 1990) is a Russian football defender.

Club career
He made his debut in the Russian Second Division for FC Torpedo Armavir on 21 August 2011 in a game against FC Energiya Volzhsky.

He made his Russian Football National League debut for PFC Spartak Nalchik on 11 July 2016 in a game against FC Kuban Krasnodar.

Personal life
His brother Zhantemir Soblirov is also a footballer.

References

External links
 
 
 Profile at Crimean Football Union

1990 births
Living people
People from Urvansky District
Russian footballers
Association football defenders
PFC Spartak Nalchik players
FC Armavir players
FC Belshina Bobruisk players
FC Angusht Nazran players
FC Luch Vladivostok players
FC Urozhay Krasnodar players
FC Zenit-Izhevsk players
Russian expatriate footballers
Expatriate footballers in Belarus
Russian First League players
Russian Second League players
Crimean Premier League players
Sportspeople from Kabardino-Balkaria